Marginella spinacia is a species of sea snail, a marine gastropod mollusk in the family Marginellidae, the margin snails.

Description
The shell of Marginella spinacia is quite small, measuring around 6mm to 9mm. The external color of the shell is generally brown, with intricate patterns of red and white that follow the paucispiral's rim. The brown areas have horizontal symmetrical rows of dots, and/or vertical oscillating lines. The shell's outer lip is thickened and denticulate.

Distribution
This species occurs in the Atlantic Ocean off São Tomé and Príncipe.

References

 Gofas S. & Fernandes F. 1988. The marginellids of São Tomé, West Africa. Journal of Conchology 33(1): 1-30, pls. 1–2.

spinacia
Endemic fauna of São Tomé and Príncipe
Invertebrates of São Tomé and Príncipe
Gastropods described in 1988